This article presents detail of the results in the 2007 Japanese House of Councillors election, breaking down results by Prefectures of Japan.

Hokkaidō 

The prefecture of Hokkaidō have two councillors in the Upper House. Democratic Party of Japan and the Liberal Democratic Party each won one seat.

Aomori 

The prefecture of Aomori have one councillor in the Upper House. Democratic Party of Japan won the seat.

Akita 

The prefecture of Akita has one councillor in the Upper House. An independent supported by the Democratic Party of Japan and Social Democratic Party won the seat.

Iwate 

The prefecture of Iwate has one councillor in the Upper House. The Democratic Party of Japan scored a major victory.

Miyagi 

The prefecture of Miyagi have two councillors in the Upper House. The Democratic Party of Japan won the seat.

Yamagata 

The prefecture of Yamagata has one councillor in the Upper House. The Democratic Party of Japan won the seat.

 
 
 
 
 
 

2007 elections in Japan
House of Councillors (Japan) elections
Election results in Japan